Jelena Dokić was the defending champion but decided not to participate.
Aleksandra Wozniak won the title, defeating Jamie Hampton 6–3, 6–1 in the final.

Seeds

Draw

Finals

Top half

Bottom half

References
 Main Draw
 Qualifying Draw

Odlum Brown Vancouver Open
Vancouver Open